Conospermum bracteosum is a shrub endemic to Western Australia.

It blooms between September and November producing cream-white flowers.

It is found in the Wheatbelt, Great Southern and Goldfields-Esperance regions of Western Australia where it grows in sandy soils often over laterite.

References

External links

Eudicots of Western Australia
bracteosum
Endemic flora of Western Australia
Plants described in 1845